The 1985 Pilot Pen Classic was a tennis tournament played on outdoor hard courts. It was the 12th edition of the Indian Wells Masters and was part of the 1985 Nabisco Grand Prix. It was played at the La Quinta Resort and Club in La Quinta, California, in the United States, from February 18 through February 25, 1985.

Finals

Singles

 Larry Stefanki defeated  David Pate 6–1, 6–4, 3–6, 6–3
 It was Stefanki's only title of the year and the 4th of his career.

Doubles

 Heinz Günthardt /  Balázs Taróczy defeated  Ken Flach /  Robert Seguso 3–6, 7–6, 6–3
 It was Günthardt's 2nd title of the year and the 32nd of his career. It was Taróczy's 1st title of the year and the 35th of his career.

Prize money

*per team

References

External links

 
 Association of Tennis Professionals (ATP) tournament profile

 
La Quinta, California
1985 Pilot Pen Classic
Pilot Pen Classic
Pilot Pen Classic
Pilot Pen Classic
Pilot Pen Classic